Paraclinus magdalenae, the Magdalena blenny, is a species of labrisomid blenny only known from around Isla Margarita in Magdalena Bay on the coast of Baja California Sur, where it is found at depths of around .

References

magdalenae
Fish described in 1969
Fish of Mexican Pacific coast